Peter Carroll (born 7 March 1932) is an Australian former rugby league footballer who played in the 1950s.

Playing career
Carroll played seven seasons for St. George between 1951-1958. He won two premierships with St. George, playing five-eighth in the 1956 Grand Final and the 1957 Grand Final. 

He retired at the end of the 1958 season. Carroll played 101 first games for the Dragons and scored 24 tries during his career.

Carroll was awarded Life Membership by St. George in 1993.

References

St. George Dragons players
Australian rugby league players
Living people
1932 births
Rugby league five-eighths
Rugby league players from New South Wales